Jess Dobkin (born 1970) is a performance artist based in Toronto, Canada. She is best known for her 2006 work The Lactation Station.

She has a B.A. in Women’s Studies from Oberlin College, and an M.F.A. in Performance Art from  Rutgers University. She is a Fellow at the Mark S. Bonham Centre for Sexual Diversity Studies at the University of Toronto.

Career
Dobkin first emerged as a performance artist in 2002. Her work draws on her experience as a lesbian and a mother. Her body often figures prominently in her performances. For example, Fee for Service (2006), was a performance installation where audience members were invited to sharpen a pencil in Dobkin's vagina.

Dobkin is also known as a community organizer and often combines this with her creative work. In May 2015, after a successful crowdfunding campaign, she collaborated with many Toronto artists to create an alternative newsstand in a vacant kiosk at the Chester Subway Station in Toronto for one year. Meant as a "creative exchange" for commuters, the kiosk acted as a space for artists' exhibition and performance, while it still functioned as a newsstand selling newspapers, magazines, and snacks for a "monetary exchange."

Dobkin has collaborated with other performance artists, including Martha Wilson, founder of the Franklin Furnace Archive.

Dobkin was a frequent performer at Montreal's Edgy Women feminist performance festival between the years 2004 and 2010.

Major exhibitions
 

In 2006, Dobkin exhibited The Lactation Station in Toronto at the Ontario College of Art and Design's Professional Gallery, curated by Paul Couillard of FADO. In this exhibition, Dobkin invited audience members to sample human breast milk. The exhibition, which was partly funded by the Canada Council for the Arts, gained widespread attention and prompted Health Canada to issue a national warning against the online sale of human breast milk. It was remounted in 2012 as part of Montreal's OFFTA Festival in co-presentation with Studio 303 at Usine C.

In 2009, Dobkin performed "Being Green," a video work in which she sings "Being Green" while dressed as Kermit the Frog and being fisted by another actor dressed as Jim Henson.

In 2015, Dobkin created How Many Performance Artists Does it Take to Change a Lightbulb (For Martha Wilson) and performed it at Enoch Turner Schoolhouse in Toronto as part of Images Festival. The work was a response and an ode to one of America’s foremost groundbreaking performance artists, Martha Wilson, offering reflections and humorous observations on the way we see. Dobkin's work was inspired by Martha Wilson’s 2005 video titled A History of Performance Art According to Me. The piece examined the history of performance art by defining its terms and conditions and acknowledging the history and inherent qualities of performance. It had multiple co-presenters, including the University of Toronto, York University, OCAD University, FADO Performance Art Centre, and the Toronto-Dominion Bank.

Works

 MONOMYTHS, 2017
 The Magic Hour, 2016
 The Artist-Run Newsstand, 2015 - 2016
 How Many Performance Artists Does it Take to Change a Light Bulb (For Martha Wilson), 2015
 The Performance Art Army, 2014
 Acting/Performing/Audience, 2014 (co-directed with Shannon Cochrane)
 Performance Artist for Hire, 2013
 Free Childcare Provided, 2013
 Affirmations for Artists, 2012
 Bleeding at the Ball, 2011
 Everything I've Got, 2010
 Being Green, 2009
 Mirror Ball, 2008-2009
 Clown Car, 2008
 The Lactation Station, 2006-2012
 Fee for Service, 2006
 Emergency Exits, 2006
 Restored, 2004
 Attending, 2003-2005
 The Two Boobs, 2003
 Composite Body, 2003
 The Mad Chef, 2000-2003
 Six Degrees of Lesbian Nation, 2003
 Magic Trick, 2003
 An Ontario Bride Seeks American Wives, 2003
 Talk to Me, 2001

Personal life
Dobkin is Jewish a lesbian, and a mother.

References

External links

jessdobkin.com
Jess Dobkin’s Social Mirror Ball – Dykes on Mykes 

1970 births
Living people
Canadian performance artists
Women performance artists
Canadian women artists
Oberlin College alumni
Rutgers University alumni
Academic staff of the University of Toronto
Canadian lesbian artists